Halsey Chase Herreshoff (born 1933) is a naval architect of production and custom yachts, sailor and former president of Herreshoff Marine Museum. At the museum he and Edward duMoulin founded the America's Cup Hall of Fame in 1992. Halsey is son of Algernon Sidney DeWolf Herreshoff (1886–1977) and Rebecca Chase (1894–1991) and the grandson of the famous Nathanael Greene Herreshoff (1848–1938). As several before him in the Herreshoff family he studied Naval Architecture. At Webb Institute of Naval Architecture he finished a bachelor's degree and later a master's at Massachusetts Institute of Technology. In the US navy he achieved rank of Lieutenant before he started as a Naval Architect at the Bethlehem Steel Company and as a teacher at MIT. Halsey was involved in politics and was the elected chief executive officer (Town Administrator) in Bristol Town Council, Rhode Island from 1986 to 1994.

As a yacht designer his Herreshoff Freedom 40 design led to a line of Herreshoff ketches from 27 to 45 feet and changed the way the world felt about un-stayed masts. Halsey might be best known for his career as an America's Cup sailor, having served on many cup defenders of the 12-metre class Era, first as bowman on Columbia in 1958 and concluding as navigator on Liberty in 1983. But perhaps his greatest contribution to sailing has been his development of the America's Cup Hall of Fame at the Herreshoff Marine Museum.

Designs
Halsey Chase Herreshoff's sailboat designs:

Alerion 38
Bristol 22 Caravel
Bristol 26
Bristol 27.7
Bristol 28
Bristol 29
Bristol 29.9
Bristol 30
Bristol 33
Bristol 34
Chrysler 20
Chrysler 22
Chrysler 26
Chrysler 30
Courier 26
Freedom 40 AC
Freedom 44
Herreshoff 27
Herreshoff 31
Herreshoff 37
Herreshoff 38
Herreshoff 45
Herreshoff America
Herreshoff Eagle
Herreshoff H-26
Herreshoff Scout
Horizon Cat 20
Horizon Day Cat 20
Sailstar 26
Starwind 22
Ticon 30
Tmi 26
Tmi 30

References 

 
Living people
1933 births
Massachusetts Institute of Technology alumni
Webb Institute alumni
American naval architects
American yacht designers
Bethlehem Steel people
People from Bristol, Rhode Island
Herreshoff family
1983 America's Cup sailors
1980 America's Cup sailors
American male sailors (sport)
1964 America's Cup sailors
1974 America's Cup sailors
1977 America's Cup sailors